Lee Seon-gi (born 10 February 1965) is a South Korean diver. He competed in two events at the 1988 Summer Olympics.

References

1965 births
Living people
South Korean male divers
Olympic divers of South Korea
Divers at the 1988 Summer Olympics
Place of birth missing (living people)
Asian Games medalists in diving
Divers at the 1986 Asian Games
Asian Games bronze medalists for South Korea
Medalists at the 1986 Asian Games
20th-century South Korean people